Semotrachia euzyga is a species of land snail in the family Camaenidae. It is endemic to the Northern Territory of Australia.

References

External links

Gastropods of Australia
euzyga
Vulnerable fauna of Australia
Gastropods described in 1894
Taxonomy articles created by Polbot